Nkanu West is a Local Government Area of Enugu State, Nigeria. Its headquarters is situated in the town of Agbani.

Nkanu West Local Government Area is made up of Agbani, Akpugo, Akegbe Ugwu, Obuoffia, Umueze, Obe, Amodu, Ozalla and Amurri. Nkanu people are predominantly farmers and butchers.It has an area of 225 km and a population of 146,695 at the 2006 census.

The postal code of the area is 402.

References

Local Government Areas in Enugu State
Local Government Areas in Igboland